is a manga series by Motoo Koyama which was serialized in Monthly Comic Nora from November 1987 to November 1996. The manga series was adapted into a three episode OVA series titled  from Toshiba EMI.

Premise, Setting, Plot
Ozanari Dungeon is an adventure manga set on a fantastical Sword and Sorcery world while occasionally shows few pieces of anacronistic technologies such as  the Guild's blimp.

This manga follows the adventures of a group of mercenaries: the barbarian Mocha (the main character), the rogue Blueman, and the mage Kiriman. Mocha and her gang belong to a mercenary guild. Their main concern is gold but they will help to save the day even if the troubles don't concern them.

In early phases of first manga, the stories are self contained and has little connection with each other. In that phase, the tone and atmosphere tend to the light-hearted and episodic. The author's drawing dramatically improves after volume 5. The plot becomes much more refined as well. After volume 10 or so, the plot becomes really profound, deep, and heavier on continuity. The scale becomes quite large, with whole nations go to war and dragon(s) which can destroy the world.

Characters

Protagonists

 Mocha is Elven (either part- or full-elf) Fighter and she acts as melee combatant in Dungeon and Dragon's "Fighter-Mage-Thief" party formation. As she has great physical strength yet little intelligence she is very close to Barbarian. Despite her very revealing suit, she is very innocent, pure and naive. The first manga shows her snippets of past with her mentor and father figure, a legendary Colosseum fighter and advanturer, Salvador. She is named after a coffee type, Mocha.

 Blueman is Nekomatango (a cat-like race) Rogue and act as a thief in Dungeon and Dragon's "Fighter-Mage-Thief" party formation. He is named after a coffee type, Blue Manjaro.

  Kiriman is a Inumoarukeba (a dog/kangaroo-like race) magician and act as a mage in Dungeon and Dragon's "Fighter-Mage-Thief" party formation. They always "talk" with written sign. They be named after a coffee type, Kili Mountain (a.k.a. Kilimoun).

  Espre is a member of Magic Academy and thus an Astral, a soul being who leaves behind physical body. He passed of as a longsword so he can follow and observe Mocha and her gang incognito. He is named after a coffee type, Espresso.

Supporting Characters
 Cain
  Cain is a bookish human prince who is smitten with Mocha. In a bid to win Mocha's heart, he trains under Falco and Keaton and starts adventuring.
 Falco
  Falco is a master swordsman and veteran adventurer. He is engaged to Azusa.
 Azusa
  Azusa is a heiress to a ninja clan. She is engaged to Falco.
 Keaton
  Keaton is a veteran adventurer. Though he looks like an expressionless airhead, he is one of the most skilled fighter in the guild

References

External links 
 
 

1987 manga
1997 manga
2006 manga
2008 manga
2010 manga
1991 anime OVAs
Shōnen manga
Sword and sorcery anime and manga
TMS Entertainment